The Roar of the Greasepaint is an album by American jazz pianist Ahmad Jamal featuring performances of tunes from the musical, The Roar of the Greasepaint – The Smell of the Crowd recorded in 1965 and released on the Argo label.

Critical reception
AllMusic awarded the album 2 stars.

Track listing
All compositions by Leslie Bricusse and Anthony Newley
 "Look at That Face"  2:56   
 "Where Would You Be Without Me?" – 2:52   
 "It Isn't Enough" – 3:25   
 "Who Can I Turn To (When Nobody Needs Me)" – 2:58   
 "Sweet Beginning" – 3:11   
 "The Dream" – 2:25   
 "Feeling Good" – 2:56   
 "My First Love Song" – 4:21   
 "A Wonderful Day Like Today" – 2:39   
 "That's What It Is To Be Young"  3:31   
 "That Beautiful Land" – 3:02

Personnel
Ahmad Jamal – piano
Jamil Nasser – bass
Chuck Lampkin – drums

References 

Argo Records albums
Ahmad Jamal albums
1965 albums
Albums produced by Esmond Edwards